Mbere (Mbede, Mbete) is a Bantu language spoken in the Republic of Congo and Gabon.

References

Mbete languages
Languages of the Republic of the Congo
Languages of Gabon